The Employees' Social Security Act 1969, is a Malaysian laws which enacted to provide social security in certain contingencies and to make provision for certain other matters in relation to it. The law is enforced by the Social Security Organization or PERKESO.

Structure
The Employees' Social Security Act 1969, in its current form (26 May 2016), consists of 7 Parts containing 112 sections and 10 schedules (including 12 amendments).
 Part I: Preliminary
 Part II: Insurability and Contributions
 Part III: Benefits
 Part IV: Administration, Finance and Audit
 Part V: Adjudication of Dispute and Claims
 Part VI: Penalties
 Part VII: Miscellaneous
 Schedules

External links
 Employees' Social Security Act 1969 
 What Is SOCSO, IPERKEO?

1969 in Malaysian law
Malaysian federal legislation